New Bern National Cemetery is a United States National Cemetery located in the city of New Bern, in Craven County, North Carolina. Administered by the United States Department of Veterans Affairs, it encompasses , and as of the end of 2005, had 7,517 interments. It is currently closed to new interments.

History 
First established on February 1, 1867, New Bern National Cemetery was initially used to reinter remains from the numerous battlefield cemeteries around the area, including nearly 1,000 unknown soldiers and the remains of Union soldiers who died at the Battle of New Bern.

New Bern National Cemetery was listed on the National Register of Historic Places in 1997.

Notable monuments 
 The 9th New Jersey Infantry Monument, a granite monument erected in 1905
 The Massachusetts Civil War Monument, a granite monument erected in 1908
 The Connecticut Monument, erected in 1908
 The Rhode Island Civil War Monument, a granite monument with a bronze statue on it, dedicated in 1909

Notable interments 
 David Heaton (1823–1870), attorney, politician, and US Representative

References

External links 

 National Cemetery Administration
 New Bern National Cemetery
 
 
 

Cemeteries on the National Register of Historic Places in North Carolina
Buildings and structures in New Bern, North Carolina
United States national cemeteries
Protected areas of Craven County, North Carolina
1867 establishments in North Carolina
Historic American Landscapes Survey in North Carolina
National Register of Historic Places in Craven County, North Carolina